Roman Artemuk (born 12 August 1995 in Novovolynsk, Volyn Oblast, Ukraine) is a professional Ukrainian football striker who plays for SK Benešov.

Career
Artemuk is product of youth football systems of Ukrainian and Czech Republic teams. He made his debut for FC Bohemians entering as a second-half substitute against Sparta Prague on 25 July 2014 in Czech First League.

On 16 March 2018, Artemuk joined Polaban Nymburk. He played for the club until 2 August 2018, where he joined Olympia Radotín. At the beginning of February 2019, Artemuk joined German club SpVgg Grün-Weiss Deggendorf.

References

External links
Profile at FC Bohemians 1905 Official Site (Czech)

Roman Artemuk at FuPa

1995 births
Living people
Ukrainian footballers
Czech First League players
Bohemians 1905 players
SK Benešov players
Ukrainian expatriate footballers
Ukrainian expatriate sportspeople in the Czech Republic
Expatriate footballers in the Czech Republic
Expatriate footballers in Germany

Association football forwards